Gesila Island is a small island separating West Channel, East Channel and China Strait, just south of Milne Bay, in Milne Bay Province, Papua New Guinea.

Administration 
The island belongs to Kuiaro, of Bwanabwana Rural Local Level Government Area LLG, Samarai-Murua District, which are in Milne Bay Province.

History 
The island is owned by the Seventh-day Adventist church. From 1961 until the 1980s it was the site of the Adventist mission headquarters for the Milne Bay area (which is now administered from Popondetta).

Geography 
The island is part of Samarai Islands of the Louisiade Archipelago.

Demographics 
The population of 19 is located on a single village on the northwest point.

Economy 
The islanders, are farmers. They are also paid for taking care of the old church building.

Transportation 
There is a dock in the village.

References

Islands of Milne Bay Province
Louisiade Archipelago